Tiidrek Nurme (born 18 November 1985) is an Estonian long and middle-distance runner, the current national record holder of the 1500 metres and 3000 metres.

Nurme is one of only five men in the history of the Olympic Games to have qualified for and competed in the 1,500 metres (2008) and the marathon (2016) in separate Olympics during their career. The other four are Rod Dixon of New Zealand (1972, 1984), Luis Feiteira of Portugal (1996, 2012), Bayron Piedra of Ecuador (2008, 2016) and Jacques Boxberger of France (1968, 1984). 

At the Beijing 2008 Summer Olympics Nurme placed 27th among 50 runners (26th after a Moroccan got banned) in 1500m. In Beijing he set a national record with a time of 3:38.59, running at 1100m as a pacemaker. 

At the Rio 2016 Summer Olympics, Nurme was part of the Olympic record-setting size marathon field when 155 men from 80 countries competed in the race where he placed 63rd overall. 

At the Tokyo 2020 Summer Olympics Nurme placed 27th among 106 runners (26th after a Moroccan got banned due to the doping violation). Tokyo 2020 marathon was the deepest field in OG history, all 106 men had to be faster than the time of 2:11:30 to qualify.

Major competition record

Personal bests

Outdoor

Indoor

References

External links

1985 births
Living people
Estonian male middle-distance runners
Athletes (track and field) at the 2008 Summer Olympics
Olympic athletes of Estonia
World Athletics Championships athletes for Estonia
Sportspeople from Kuressaare
Estonian male long-distance runners
Athletes (track and field) at the 2016 Summer Olympics
Competitors at the 2007 Summer Universiade
Athletes (track and field) at the 2020 Summer Olympics
Estonian male marathon runners